Mabel Winifred Gunn  (1 June 1890 – 7 January 1970) was a New Zealand district nurse and hospital matron. She was born in Moorlinch, Somerset, England, on 1 June 1890.

In the 1960 Queen's Birthday Honours, Gunn was appointed a Member of the Order of the British Empire, in recognition of her services as matron of Whataroa Hospital.

References

1890 births
1970 deaths
New Zealand nurses
People from Sedgemoor (district)
British emigrants to New Zealand
New Zealand Members of the Order of the British Empire
New Zealand women nurses